Hugo Kārlis Grotuss (January 17, 1884 in Jaunpils parish "Dočkos" – January 16, 1951 in Dillingen) was a Latvian painter, classified as a Realist. His paintings and drawings include some of the best known and most popular works in Latvian art.

Biography
He studied in the studio of Jūlijs Madernieks and also in the Central School of Technical Drawing of Saint Petersburg. He worked as a drawing teacher in some schools of Saint Petersburg, and then became a vice-principal of the Shuvalov – Ozerskov Gymnasium.

In 1920 Grotuss returned to Latvia. He was a member of the Union of Independent Painters, also a member of the board participating in exhibitions of that Union (1921–1934). Then he worked again as a school teacher. During his life he made around 2000 paintings.

References

1884 births
1951 deaths
People from Jaunpils Municipality
People from Courland Governorate
20th-century Latvian painters
Soviet painters
Latvian emigrants to Germany